Manuel Gómez-Moreno Martínez (21 February 1870 in Granada, Spain – 7 June 1970 in Madrid, Spain), was a Spanish archaeologist and historian.

Biography 
Martinez was born 21 February 1870 in Granada, Spain. He is the son of noted painter and amateur archaeologist, Manuel Gómez-Moreno González and Dolores Martínez Almirón.

He authored many books, nearly 300, mostly focused on Hispanic archeology and art history. During the first years of the twentieth century he wrote Catálogo Monumental y artístico de España  (en: Monumental and Artistic Catalog of Spain). 

Gómez-Moreno was named Doctor honoris causa by the universities of Montevideo and Oxford in 1941, Glasgow in 1951 and Granada in 1970. One of his students was Hispanic art historian, José María de Azcárate.

See also 
 San Pedro de la Nave

References

External links
 
Biography (Spanish) (Universidad de Alcalá).

20th-century Spanish historians
1870 births
1970 deaths
Spanish centenarians
Men centenarians
20th-century Spanish archaeologists
Architecture academics